The San Fernando Valley Sun is a newspaper published in San Fernando, California near Los Angeles, California, USA.

History
The newspaper was established in 1904 by Herbert W. Brooks. Over the years, the name and format of the newspaper changed several times.

After Brooks, the newspaper was purchased by Robert K. Straus, an heir to the Macy's fortune. It was later acquired by Michael Flannery, who sold it to the Hearst Corporation. It was purchased by the Barrios family in 1985. In 2001, it was purchased by Sev Aszkenazy, a real estate developer, and his wife, Martha Diaz-Aszkenazy, a businesswoman.

On October 8, 2004, Congressman Howard Berman gave a brief speech to highlight the one-hundred anniversary of the newspaper.

References

1904 establishments in California
Publications established in 1904
Newspapers published in Greater Los Angeles
San Fernando, California